Anna Krisztina Illés (born 21 February 1994) is a Hungarian water polo player. At the 2016 and the 2020 Summer Olympics she competed for the Hungary women's national water polo team in the women's tournament.

See also
 List of World Aquatics Championships medalists in water polo

References

External links
 

1994 births
Living people
Sportspeople from Budapest
Hungarian female water polo players
World Aquatics Championships medalists in water polo
Water polo players at the 2016 Summer Olympics
Water polo players at the 2020 Summer Olympics
Medalists at the 2020 Summer Olympics
Olympic bronze medalists for Hungary in water polo
21st-century Hungarian women